Andhra Pradesh is one of the southern state of Indian sub continent. There are a total of 26 districts in the two regions of Coastal Andhra and Rayalaseema. The capital of the state is the Amaravati alongside, Hyderabad being the joint capital of both Andhra Pradesh and Telangana for 10 years from the date 2 June 2014.

The census over the years grown steadily in terms of population. It shares borders with states like Tamil Nadu, Orissa, Telangana and Karnataka. Based on the Census of India (2011), the state has a population of 49,471,555 residents. The sex ratio is way above the national average at 992 as against 978 in 2001.

Spread over an area of 160,205 km2, the state has a population density of 308 as against 277 in 2001 Census, which is below the national average. Registered growth rate of the population is 11.10 as against 14.59 recorded in the 2001 census. The decadal growth rate has come down by 3.49 during the 2001-2011.

Literacy rate in 2011 was 67.77% as against 60.47% recorded in 2001 census. It is an increase of 7.19%. The official language of the state is Telugu.

Religion

References

Andhra
Andhra Pradesh